The equatorial greytail (Xenerpestes singularis) is a species of bird in the family Furnariidae. It is found in Ecuador and Peru. Its natural habitat is subtropical or tropical moist montane forest. It is threatened by habitat loss.

References

equatorial greytail
Birds of the Ecuadorian Andes
Birds of the Peruvian Andes
equatorial greytail
equatorial greytail
Taxonomy articles created by Polbot